Daniel Francis Minahan (August 8, 1877, Springfield, Ohio – April 29, 1947) was an American Democratic Party politician from New Jersey who represented the 6th congressional district from 1919 to 1921 and again from 1923 to 1925.

Biography
Minahan was born in Springfield, Ohio on August 8, 1877. He attended Stevens Institute Preparatory School and Seton Hall College in South Orange, New Jersey. He was superintendent of work for his father, who was a contractor. He served as Mayor of Orange, New Jersey from May 1914 until August 1919, when he resigned.

Minahan was elected as a Democrat to the Sixty-sixth Congress, serving in office from March 4, 1919 to March 3, 1921, but was an unsuccessful candidate for reelection in 1920 to the Sixty-seventh Congress. He was again elected to the Sixty-eighth Congress, serving from March 4, 1923 to March 3, 1925. He was unsuccessful candidate for reelection in 1924 to the Sixty-ninth Congress and for election in 1930 to the Seventy-second Congress.

He was a delegate to the 1928 Democratic National Convention. He engaged in land development and resided in East Orange, New Jersey, until his death on April 29, 1947. He was interred in St. Johns Catholic Cemetery, in Orange, New Jersey.

References

External links

Daniel F. Minahan at The Political Graveyard

1877 births
1947 deaths
Democratic Party members of the United States House of Representatives from New Jersey
Politicians from East Orange, New Jersey
Seton Hall University alumni
Mayors of Orange, New Jersey